Russula pseudointegra is an inedible, quite rare mushroom of the genus Russula, with a similar habitat and appearance to Russula rosea. 
Russula pseudointegra is distinguished by its hot tasting flesh.

See also
List of Russula species

References

E. Garnweidner. Mushrooms and Toadstools of Britain and Europe. Collins. 1994.

External links

pseudointegra
Fungi of Europe
Fungi described in 1907